Tulse Hill ward is an administrative division of the London Borough of Lambeth, England. It stretches up from Brixton town centre to the South Circular road. The area contains several large housing estates around Tulse Hill, the road, but does not contain Tulse Hill railway station. At the 2011 Census the population of the Ward was 15,771.

Lambeth Council elections 2018

References

External information
Lambeth Borough Council ward profile
Tulse Hill ward election results on Lambeth website
Tulse  Labour Councillors website

Wards of the London Borough of Lambeth